Stephen McBride  is an Anglican priest: he has been Archdeacon of Connor since 2002.

McBride was born in 1961. He was educated at the Royal Belfast Academical Institution, Queen's University, Belfast and Trinity College, Dublin; and ordained in 1988. He was a curate in Antrim and then Belfast. He was Chaplain to the Bishop of Connor from 1994 until 2002; and has been the incumbent at Antrim since 1995.

References

1961 births
Clergy from Belfast
Living people
Archdeacons of Connor
People educated at the Royal Belfast Academical Institution
Alumni of Queen's University Belfast
Alumni of Trinity College Dublin